Events from the year 1377 in Ireland.

Incumbent
Lord: Edward III (until 21 June), then Richard II

Events
 Robert Wikeford, Primate of Ireland appointed Lord Chancellor of Ireland.

Deaths

 Brian Ó Flaithbheartaigh was a possible Taoiseach of Iar Connacht and Chief of the Name. He is thought to have been Taoiseach, but he is not explicitly named as such in his obituary.

References